Timothy or Tim Hunt may refer to:

 J. Timothy Hunt, American-Canadian author and journalist
 Tim Hunt, English biochemist
 Tim Hunt (baseball), American baseball player
 Tim Hunt (singer), American singer
 Tim Hunt (speedway rider) (born 1960), English speedway rider